The Treaty of Kalat (Urdu: قلات کے معاہدے) was an 1875 agreement between the British Raj and the Baloch tribes bordering the Punjab region in modern-day Pakistan.

Negotiated by British chargé d'affaires Robert Groves Sandeman, the treaty reconciled the warring tribes of the region with their Khan and recognised the direct rule of the British over the Khanate of Kalat.

The subsequent treaty was signed by the Khan and the Viceroy of India, Lord Lytton in 1876 at Jacobabad in modern-day Sindh, Pakistan.

See also
Baluchistan Agency

References

Bibliography

History of Pakistan
Khanate of Kalat